Martin McCurtis (born May 7, 1977), known professionally as Helluva, is an American record producer, rapper, singer, and songwriter from Detroit, Michigan. He is noted for producing the 2016 single "First Day Out" by Tee Grizzley.

Early life
Martin McCurtis was born in Detroit, Michigan and raised on the Southwest side of the city.

Career
Helluva began his career as a rap artist and producer for the independent record labels Made West Entertainment and Watchout Entertainment. Early on, he assisted local rappers, and later worked with Akon and Yo Gotti. His son "came up with his famous 'Helluva Made This Beat Baby' drop". He also produced Tee Grizzley and Lil Yachty's single, From the D to the A. In 2018, he produced tracks on Still My Moment and The Pimp Tape .
In 2019, Helluva was the musical director for the independent film Out of Bounds, and in 2020, he produced tracks for Megan Thee Stallion's Suga EP.

Influence
Okayplayer wrote, "Helluva is bringing Detroit street rap to the mainstream," and Detroit Metro Times called Helluva "the musical architect" of "Detroit trap".

References

African-American male rappers
American hip hop record producers
Rappers from Detroit
21st-century American rappers
Living people
1977 births
21st-century American male musicians
21st-century African-American musicians
20th-century African-American people